Mersin İdmanyurdu (also Mersin İdman Yurdu, Mersin İY, or MİY) Sports Club; located in Mersin, east Mediterranean coast of Turkey in 2013–14. Team participated in 13th season of the league for 7th time. Mersin İdmanyurdu football team has finished 2013–14 season in 6th place in Turkish TFF First League and became eligible to play play-off games. At the end of play-off games MİY has promoted to 2014–15 Süper Lig after one year disappearance. Mersin İdmanyurdu participated in 2013–14 Turkish Cup and was eliminated in second elimination round.

Ali Kahramanlı was club president. Hakan Kutlu has continued from previous season as head coach. Later Yılmaz Vural took over the team. Kutlu managed the final game. Güven Varol was both most appeared player and top goalscorer.

2013–14 TFF First League participation
Mersin İdmanyurdu took place in 2013–14 TFF First League. League was played as PTT First League for sponsorship reasons. 19 teams attended due to return of Ankaraspor who were withdrawn from the league in 2010–11 season and reserved their right to attend depending on a court decision. Winners, runners-up and play-off winners were promoted to 2014–15 Süper Lig. Play-offs were played among four teams who finished season at 3rd thru 6th positions. Bottom four teams were relegated to 2014–15 TFF Second League.

Mersin İdmanyurdu finished 2013–14 TFF First League season at 6th place and was qualified for play-offs. Team won the play-offs and promoted to 2014–15 Süper Lig at the end of the season.

Results summary
Mersin İdmanyurdu (MİY) 2013–14 TFF First League season league summary.

Sources: 2013–14 TFF First League pages.

League table
Mersin İdmanyurdu (MİY) 2013–14 TFF First League season place in league table.

Results by round
Results of games MİY played in 2013–14 TFF First League by rounds.

First half
Mersin İdmanyurdu (MİY) 2013–14 TFF First League season first half game reports is shown in the following table.
Kick off times are in EET and EEST.

Sources: 2013–14 PTT First League pages.

Second half
Mersin İdmanyurdu (MİY) 2013–14 TFF First League season second half game reports is shown in the following table.
Kick off times are in EET and EEST.

Sources: 2013–14 PTT First League pages.

Play-offs
Mersin İdmanyurdu (MİY) 2013–14 TFF First League finished the normal season at sixth place and became eligible to play play-off games. After play-off round the team promoted to 2014–15 Süper Lig. Semifinals played in a round-robin elimination rule while final match was played in a neutral venue, İstanbul Şükrü Saracoğlu Stadium, Fenerbahçe's grounds.

Semifinals

At semifinals Mersin İdmanyurdu paired with Orduspor who finished normal season at third place. At semifinals teams played home and away matches. İdmanyurdu won both of the games and promoted to finals.

Sources: 2013–14 PTT First League pages.

Finals

At finals, teams played a single match at a neutral venue. İdmanyurdu defeated Samsunspor who finished normal season at 5th place, and promoted to 2014–15 Süper Lig.

Sources: 2013–14 PTT First League pages.

2013–14 Turkish Cup participation
2013–14 Turkish Cup was played for 52nd time as Ziraat Türkiye Kupası for sponsorship reasons. The Cup was played by 158 teams in 1 preliminary and 5 one-leg elimination stages and a two-legs group stage in two groups (A, B), after which first and second teams in each group played semifinals. Galatasaray won the Cup for 15th time. Mersin İdmanyurdu took place in second elimination stage and eliminated to then amateur league team Niğde Belediyespor.

Cup track
The drawings and results Mersin İdmanyurdu (MİY) followed in 2013–14 Turkish Cup are shown in the following table.

Note: In the above table 'Score' shows For and Against goals whether the match played at home or not.

Game details
Mersin İdmanyurdu (MİY) 2013–14 Turkish Cup game reports is shown in the following table.
Kick off times are in EET and EEST.

Source: 2013–14 Ziraat Türkiye Kupası pages.

Management
President Ali Kahramanlı continued in his position which he held in 2008. * Club address was: Palmiye Mah. Adnan Menderes Bl. 1204 Sk. Onur Ap. K.2 D.3 Yenişehir/Mersin.

Club management
Club President was Ali Kahramanlı.

Coaching team
At the start of the season head coach was Hakan Kutlu. His assistants were Hakan Çobanoğlu (trainer), Hail İbrahim Özdemir, Serhat Kandemir and Ercan Akça (physicians), Kemal Gürgez and Barış Demirdizen (masseurs). Yılmaz Vural took the position prior to 29th round derby against Adana Demirspor. Hakan Kutlu signed on 16 May 2014 only for the final game. His contract ended on 31 May 2014.

2012–13 Mersin İdmanyurdu head coaches

Note: Only official games were included.

2013–14 squad
Appearances, goals and cards count for 2013–14 TFF First League and 2013–14 Turkish Cup games. Only the players who appeared in game rosters were included. Kit numbers were allowed to select by players. 18 players appeared in each game roster, three to be replaced. Players are listed in order of appearance.

Sources: TFF club page and maçkolik team page.

U-21 team
Mersin İdmanyurdu U-21 team had participated in 2013–14 U-21 League. League was played in three stages. In the first stage, 61 teams played ranking group games in 8 groups on regional basis. 5 consisted of 8 and 3 consisted of 7 teams. In the second stage winners of each group consisted final group while the rest played classification group games. In the third stage, winners of classification groups played elimination matches and winners played quarterfinals with first four placed teams in final group. Mersin İdmanyurdu U-21 team took place in Ranking Group 5 and finished 3rd in the first stage. In the second stage the team took place in Classification Group 5 and finished 3rd with 7 wins, 6 deuces and 9 losses.

See also
 Football in Turkey
 2013–14 TFF First League
 2013–14 Turkish Cup

Notes and references

2013-14
Turkish football clubs 2013–14 season